John Macdonald (1886 – 1960) was a Scottish footballer who played mainly as an outside right.

Born in Fife, he commenced his playing career with Raith Rovers in 1901 before moving to Rangers in January 1907. He was signed by for Liverpool of the English Football League in 1909, and made 35 total appearances (league and FA Cup) in his debut season; 26 and 20 appearances followed during his next two years at the club, and he came close to receiving an international call-up for Scotland, taking part in the annual Home Scots v Anglo-Scots trial match in 1910.

He was unable to hold a regular starting place in the Liverpool side, and moved to Newcastle United in 1912. He served in the Gordon Highlanders during World War I while resuming his sporting career back in Scotland with Dundee. He retired in 1921 after a second spell with Raith Rovers, and found work locally as a miner.

Macdonald had six brothers, two of whom – David and Roy – were also footballers. All three were members of the Dundee squad in the 1919–20 season.

References

1886 births
1960 deaths
Scottish footballers
Liverpool F.C. players
Newcastle United F.C. players
Rangers F.C. players
English Football League players
Date of death missing
Footballers from Kirkcaldy
Raith Rovers F.C. players
Association football outside forwards
British Army personnel of World War I
Gordon Highlanders soldiers
Association football inside forwards
Dundee F.C. players
Scottish Football League players